Jim Betts may refer to:

 Jim Betts (politician) (born  1932), former member of the Ohio House of Representatives
 Jim Betts (American football) (born c. 1949), former American football player, university administrator, and business executive